Alitalia CityLiner S.p.A. was an Italian regional airline and a subsidiary of Alitalia. It maintained two bases at Leonardo da Vinci–Fiumicino Airport in Rome and at Linate Airport in Milan. The airline operated short haul domestic and international point to point flights using Embraer E-Jet aircraft on behalf of its parent. The airline was a SkyTeam affiliate member through its parent company. It was originally founded by Air One that merged with Alitalia in 2009 and was subsequently renamed.

History

Alitalia CityLiner was founded as Air One CityLiner S.p.A. in June 2006, as a subsidiary of Air One, with a brand new fleet of ten Bombardier CRJ-900s. It commenced operations with flights between Trieste and Rome Fiumicino; and Genoa and Naples, on 7 June. In February 2007, it started its first international route, between Turin and Paris-Charles de Gaulle.

On 13 January 2009, Air One and Alitalia merged under the Alitalia brand name, therefore Air One CityLiner S.p.A. was reincorporated as Alitalia CityLiner S.p.A.

On 20 April 2011, the airline was rebranded as Alitalia CityLiner. It became the only regional airline of the Alitalia group and has taken up the role formerly performed by Alitalia Express. A brand new fleet of 20 Embraer 175s and 190s was delivered between September 2011 and March 2013.

As of August 2019, the airline Parent Company and itself are currently under Extraordinary Administration (EA), this due to years of not making profitability. Since 2020, Alitalia CityLiner Parent Company, Alitalia, has been fully owned by the Italian government.

Due to its parent company entering administration, Alitalia CityLiner ceased operations at the same time as its parent company, Alitalia, on 15 October 2021 when both were replaced by ITA Airways.

Destinations 

Alitalia CityLiner operated short-haul domestic and international routes within the network of Alitalia. It had a Hub at Milan-Linate Airport.

Alliances 

As Alitalia was part of SkyTeam Alliance from 2009 to 2021, Alitalia CityLiner had been a member-affiliate of the alliance.

Fleet

Former fleet 
Before ceasing operations, the Alitalia CityLiner fleet consists of the following aircraft:

Historical fleet 
Over the years, Alitalia has operated the following aircraft types (including aircraft inherited from Alitalia Express and Air One CityLiner):

References

External links
Official website

Former SkyTeam affiliate members
Defunct airlines of Italy
European Regions Airline Association
Airlines established in 2006
Italian companies established in 2006
Airlines disestablished in 2021
2021 disestablishments in Italy